Lysosomal thioesterase PPT2 (PPT-2), also known as S-thioesterase G14, is an enzyme that in humans is encoded by the PPT2 gene.

Function 
This gene encodes a member of the palmitoyl protein thioesterase family. The encoded glycosylated lysosomal protein has palmitoyl-CoA hydrolase activity in vitro, but does not hydrolyze palmitate from cysteine residues in proteins.

References

Further reading

EC 3.1.2